A constitutional referendum was held in Algeria on 28 November 1996. Held amidst the Algerian Civil War, the amendments would prohibit the use of Islam and ethnic identity in domestic politics. Despite calls for a boycott, the amendments were approved by 85.8% of voters with a 79.8% turnout. Parliamentary elections were held the following year.

Results

References

1996 in Algeria
Algeria
Algerian Civil War
1996 elections in Africa
Constitutional referendums in Algeria